Anatoly Nikolayevich Baidachny (born 1 October 1952) is a Russian football manager.

International career
Baidachny made his debut for USSR on 30 April 1972 in the UEFA Euro 1972 quarterfinal against Yugoslavia. He won his last cap in the Final against West Germany on 14 June, when he was 19.

Coaching career
In January 2010 the former Belarus national football team and FC Darida Minsk Raion coach has joined FC Terek Grozny, he replaced Shahin Diniyev, who already managed Terek's reserves team. In January 2011 he was replaced at Terek by Ruud Gullit.

On 24 March 2021, Ararat-Armenia announced Baidachny as their new head coach, leaving the role  months later, on 8 June 20201, by mutual consent, having won just three of his twelve games in charge.

Honors
 UEFA Euro 1972 runner-up.

References

External links
Profile in Russian

1952 births
Living people
Footballers from Moscow
Russian footballers
Soviet footballers
Soviet Union international footballers
UEFA Euro 1972 players
Soviet Top League players
FC Dynamo Moscow players
FC Dinamo Minsk players
Soviet football managers
Russian football managers
Belarusian football managers
Russian Premier League managers
Russian expatriate football managers
Expatriate football managers in Cyprus
Expatriate football managers in Syria
Expatriate football managers in Kuwait
Expatriate football managers in Moldova
FC Dnepr Mogilev managers
FC Zorya Luhansk managers
FC Krystal Kherson managers
CS Tiligul-Tiras Tiraspol managers
FC Dinamo Minsk managers
FC Zhemchuzhina Sochi managers
FC Chernomorets Novorossiysk managers
FC Rostov managers
Belarus national football team managers
FC Darida Minsk Raion managers
FC Akhmat Grozny managers
FC Fakel Voronezh managers
Association football forwards
Al-Yarmouk SC (Kuwait) managers
Russian expatriate sportspeople in Kuwait
Russian expatriate sportspeople in Syria
Russian expatriate sportspeople in Armenia
Russian expatriate sportspeople in Moldova
Russian expatriate sportspeople in Cyprus
Russian expatriate sportspeople in Ukraine
Russian expatriate sportspeople in Belarus
Expatriate football managers in Belarus
Expatriate football managers in Ukraine
Expatriate football managers in Armenia